José Bohr (3 September 1901 – 29 May 1994) was a German-born Chilean film director, producer, actor and screenwriter. He directed 35 films between 1919 and 1969.

Selected filmography

Actor
 Así es la vida (1930)
 Rogue of the Rio Grande (1930)
 Sombras de gloria (1930)
 Ex-Flame (1930)
 Hollywood, ciudad de ensueño (1931)

Director
 La sangre manda (1934)
 Luponini de Chicago (1935)
 Sueño de amor (1935)
 Así es la mujer (1936)
 Por mis pistolas (1938)
 El látigo (1939)
 Si mis campos hablaran (1947)
 La dama de las camelias (1947)
 Mis espuelas de plata (1948)
 Tonto pillo (1948)
 Uno que ha sido marino (1951)
 El gran circo Chamorro (1955)
 Un chileno en España (1962)
 Sonrisas de Chile (1970)

References

External links

1901 births
1994 deaths
20th-century Chilean male actors
Chilean film directors
Chilean film producers
Chilean male film actors
Chilean screenwriters
Male screenwriters
Mass media people from Bonn
German emigrants to Chile
20th-century screenwriters